Lumnitzera littorea is a species of mangrove. It is native to tropical coastal and estuarine areas of the eastern Indian Ocean and western Pacific Ocean, Including India, Sri Lanka, the Andaman Islands, Myanmar, Thailand, Malaysia, Brunei, Indonesia, Cambodia, Vietnam, Hainan, the Philippines, Timor Leste, New Guinea, northern Australia (Northern Territory and Queensland), the Solomon Islands, and Vanuatu.

References

Mangroves
Combretaceae
Central Indo-Pacific flora
Western Indo-Pacific flora